Ntuli is a South African surname that may refer to
Bheki Ntuli (1957 –  2021), a South African politician
Bheki Ntuli (eThekwini politician), a South African politician
Bongi Ntuli (born 1991), South African football striker
Mbali Ntuli (born c. 1988), South African politician 
Mdumiseni Ntuli (born 1979), a South African politician
Mwele Ntuli Malecela (born 1963), Director General of the Tanzanian National Institute for Medical Research
Nhlakanipho Ntuli (born 1996), South African football midfielder
Pitika Ntuli (born 1942), South African sculptor, poet, writer, and academic
Nqobile Ntuli  (born 1996), South African field hockey
Sibusiso Ntuli (born 1988), South African football midfielder 
Siphesihle Ntuli, South African field hockey coach
Tshepo Ntuli (born 1995), South African cricketer

Ntuli is also a Zulu clan.

See also
Ntuli v Donald, a 2010 privacy case in England

Bantu-language surnames
Surnames of African origin
Zulu-language surnames